The 1986 European Cup final was a football match held at the Ramón Sánchez Pizjuán Stadium, Seville, on 7 May 1986 that saw Steaua București of Romania defeat Barcelona of Spain in a penalty shoot out after 120 minutes of play could not separate the two sides. Barcelona had all of their spot-kicks saved by Steaua goalkeeper Helmuth Duckadam, who was later dubbed "The Hero of Seville". It was the first European Cup final to finish goalless and remains Steaua's only European Cup triumph, and the first of only two won by an Eastern European club.

Route to the final

Match

Details

See also
1985–86 European Cup
1986 UEFA Cup Final
1986 European Cup Winners' Cup Final
1986 European Super Cup
1986 Intercontinental Cup
FC Barcelona in international football competitions
FC Steaua București in European football

References

External links
1985–86 season at UEFA website
European Cup results at Rec.Sport.Soccer Statistics Foundation
Sevilla 1986 – Steaua Bucharest fans 
European Cup History 1986

1986
1
European Cup Final 1986
European Cup Final 1986
European Cup Final 1986
1986 European Cup Final
European
Euro
May 1986 sports events in Europe
Sports competitions in Seville
20th century in Seville